Ellamanda is a village in Palnadu district of the Indian state of Andhra Pradesh. It is located in Narasaraopet mandal of Narasaraopet revenue division.

Governance 

Ellamanda gram panchayat is the local self-government of the village. It is divided into wards and each ward is represented by a ward member.

Education 

As per the school information report for the academic year 2018–19, the village has a total of 16 schools. These include 14 Zilla Parishad/MPP and 2 private schools.

References 

Villages in Palnadu district